Deja Foxx (c. 2000) is a reproductive rights activist, political strategist and blogger known for being the youngest staffer and first Influencer and Surrogate Strategist on U.S. Vice President Kamala Harris' presidential campaign, and for her work with Planned Parenthood.

Early life and education 
Foxx is a Filipino-American  who grew up in Tucson, Arizona, where she attended a magnet school. While at school, Foxx worked at a gas station to help support her mother. Foxx was made homeless after her mother could no longer care for her and had to stay at various friends' houses.

Foxx is currently a student at Columbia University on a full scholarship. At Columbia, Foxx made the Dean's List.

Career and activism 
Foxx became involved with Planned Parenthood after using their services as a 15-year-old. When she was 16, she gained wide-spread attention after she attended a town hall and confronted former Senator, Jeff Flake, regarding his views on funding for Planned Parenthood Title X program.

Foxx founded several organizations and platforms on the themes of feminism and reproductive rights. While in school, Foxx also lead campaigned for better reproductive and sex education in her school district. in 2017, Foxx founded a non-proft provides training and payment for individuals to run safe-sex clinics called The El Rio Reproductive Health Access Project. The project targets "non-traditional leaders like homeless teens, POC, and teen moms". While at university, Foxx founded GenZ Girl Gang, an online support network for young women.

At the age of 19, Foxx took a year off of college and worked for Vice President Kamala Harris' as the youngest staffer as first ever Influencer and Surrogate Strategist on the Harris' 2020 presidential campaign. When Harris ended her presidential campaign, Foxx started working on Ignite the Vote, a campaign encouraging young people to vote in the 2020 presidential election.

In 2019, Fox served as a senior partner at Gen Z marketing firm JUV Consulting.

Awards 
In 2018, Foxx was named in Teen Vogue's 21 under 21 and in the Dazed 100 in 2019.

For her reproductive rights activism, Foxx received Planned Parenthood’s Catalyst for Change Award.

References 

2000s births
People from Tucson, Arizona
Columbia University people
American women in politics
American women's rights activists
Reproductive rights activists
Living people
21st-century American women
American people of Filipino descent